The 1964–65 season was Colchester United's 23rd season in their history and their third successive season in the Third Division, the third tier of English football. Alongside competing in the Third Division, the club also participated in the FA Cup and the League Cup.

Neil Franklin's first full season in charge saw an influx of new players, with 14 new arrivals at Layer Road replacing a host of experienced players, including former apprentice Peter Wright and experienced wing half Roy McCrohan. As such, Colchester's form suffered and the club battled against relegation for much of the season. They were eventually relegated after finishing in 23rd-position.

Colchester's fortunes in the cup competitions were no better than the league. They experienced early exits in each cup, twice being eliminated by Torquay United.

Season overview
With manager Neil Franklin looking to make his mark on the Colchester first–team, Roy McCrohan, Keith Rutter and Peter Wright all left the club, and 14 new players arrived across the season. The biggest surprise to United fans was when Wright was not named on the retained list for the season. The former apprentice who had spent his entire career as a part–time professional with Colchester had scored 99 goals in 453 league and cup matches.

Having already sold one half of the previously prolific strike force of Bobby Hunt and Martyn King when Hunt left for Northampton Town earlier in 1964, Franklin sold King to Wrexham in October of the same year, and without their goals, a season of struggle ensued. Colchester could only manage 50 league goals across the season.

Franklin's first–ever signing, Derek Trevis, was an ever–present during the season, as was Duncan Forbes, while Billy Stark ended the season as top scorer with 14 league and cup goals. It was an injury–plagued season for Colchester, with Barrie Aitchison, Mike Grice, Martyn King, Gareth Salisbury and Billy Stark all ruled out as early as September, meaning Franklin had to call upon Noel Kearney, a former Ipswich Town player who had been released by the club three months earlier. Kearney signed on a month–long trial and played three games for Colchester, all of which ended in defeat.

Colchester were relegated back to the Fourth Division with Franklin having already been handed a year's contract extension mid-season. Average attendance hit an all-time low figure of 3,634 and the Supporter's Club could only muster 997 members.

The season was also notable for the introduction of inside-forward Dennis Barrett, Colchester United's first professional apprentice, who was taken on in the summer of 1964.

Players

Transfers

In

 Total spending:  ~ £3,450

Out

 Total incoming:  ~ £3,000

Match details

Friendlies

Third Division

Results round by round

League table

Matches

League Cup

FA Cup

Squad statistics

Appearances and goals

|-
!colspan="14"|Players who appeared for Colchester who left during the season

|}

Goalscorers

Clean sheets
Number of games goalkeepers kept a clean sheet.

Player debuts
Players making their first-team Colchester United debut in a fully competitive match.

See also
List of Colchester United F.C. seasons

References

General
Books

Websites

Specific

1964-65
English football clubs 1964–65 season